Guanine nucleotide-binding protein subunit alpha-14 is a protein that in humans is encoded by the GNA14 gene. G14α is a member of the Gq alpha subunit family, and functions as a constituent of a heterotrimeric G protein in cell signal transduction.

See also
 Gq alpha subunit
 Heterotrimeric G protein

References